Suputhrudu is a 1971 Indian Telugu-language drama film, produced by Jagarlamudi Subba Rao, Gorantla Rajendra Prasad on Madhavi Combines banner and directed by T. Rama Rao. It stars Akkineni Nageswara Rao and Lakshmi, with music composed by K. V. Mahadevan.

Plot 
In a village, a naïve girl Lakshmi (Anjali Devi) loves a devious and materialistic person Dharmaraju (Jaggayya) and her grandfather Parandhamaiah (Perumallu) fixes their alliance. At the same time, Dharmaraju's maternal uncle Raghunatha Rao (Dhulipala) a millionaire, aspires to couple up his daughter with him. By the time, Lakshmi is pregnant, so, Dharmaraju ploys with his friend Nagabhushanam (Rajanala) and denounces Lakshmi as a slut before villagers. The one leads to the death of Parandhamaiah and Lakshmi is ostracized from the village. Right now, Dr. Dayanidhi (Gummadi) a humanitarian shields her when she gives birth to a baby boy Gopi. At Present, Lakshmi is scared out of society when Dayanidhi adopts Gopi (Master Yerramilli Srinivas) and Lakshmi stays behind as governess. Years roll by, and Gopi (Akkineni Nageswara Rao) grows up under the pampering of Dayanidhi and treats Lakshmi as a servant. In college, he falls for a charming girl Madhavi (Lakshmi), the daughter of Nagabhushanam. Being cognizant of it, everyone accepts their espousal, apart from Lakshmi as Nagabhushanam is responsible for her plights. At that moment, enraged Gopi necks her out when Dayanidhi is afflicted. Before dying, he reveals the birth secret of Gopi when he aims to prove his mother's chastity. Thereafter, Gopi lands at the village and starts his play against Dharmaraju & Nagabhushanam with the help of Madhavi. Ultimately, he succeeds to confess their guilt before the villagers. At last, reformed Dharmaraju affirms Lakshmi as his wife and she too announces Gopi as their son. Finally, the movie ends on a happy note with the marriage of Gopi & Madhavi.

Cast 

Akkineni Nageswara Rao as Gopi
Lakshmi as Madhavi
Jaggayya as Dharmaraju
Gummadi as Dr.Dayanidhi
Anjali Devi as Lakshmi
Rajanala as Nagabhushanam
Mikkilineni as Venkata Swamy
Dhulipala as Raghunatha Rao
Padmanabham as Papa Rao
Vijayachander as Ramesh
Surabhi Balasaraswathi as Nagabhushanam's wife
Raavi Kondala Rao
Sakshi Ranga Rao as Gurunatham
Perumallu as Parandhamaiah
Kakarala as Subbaiah
Sarathi
Master Yerramilli Srinivas as Young Gopi

Crew 
Art: G. V. Subba Rao
Choreography: Tangappan, Chinni-Sampath
Fights: Raghavulu
Dialogues: Bollimuntha Sivarama Krishna
Lyrics: Acharya Aatreya, C. Narayana Reddy, Kosaraju
Playback: Ghantasala, P. Susheela
Music: K. V. Mahadevan
Story: V. C. Guhanathan
Screenplay: Mullapudi Venkata Ramana
Editing: K. A. Marthand
Cinematography: P. S. Selvaraj
Producer: Jagarlamudi Subba Rao, Gorantla Rajendra Prasad
Director: T. Rama Rao
Banner: Madhavi Combines
Release Date: 29 April 1971

Soundtrack 

Music composed by K. V. Mahadevan.

References

External links 
 

Indian drama films
Films directed by T. Rama Rao
Films scored by K. V. Mahadevan
1971 drama films